Joseph Sydney Hammond (born October 27, 1977) is an American baseball coach and former utility player, who is the current head baseball coach of the High Point Panthers. He played college baseball at Charlotte for head coach Loren Hibbs from 1996 to 1998 before playing professionally from 1998 to 2008.

Playing career
Hammond attended Governor Thomas Johnson High School and played college baseball at Charlotte.

Coaching career
Hammond began his coaching career at Westchester Country Day School. He then became and assistant coach at Wake Forest.

On June 17, 2021, Hammond was named the head coach of the High Point Panthers.

Head coaching record

References

External links

 High Point Panthers bio

Charlotte 49ers baseball players
High school baseball coaches in the United States
Wake Forest Demon Deacons baseball coaches
High Point Panthers baseball coaches
Baseball players from Maryland
Living people
1977 births
Bluefield Orioles players
Bowie Baysox players
Delmarva Shorebirds players
Frederick Keys players
Lehigh Valley IronPigs players
Ottawa Lynx players
American expatriate baseball players in Canada
Reading Phillies players
Rochester Red Wings players
Baseball coaches from Maryland